Santo Antônio de Goiás is a municipality in central Goiás state, Brazil, located just north of the state capital, Goiânia.

Distance from Goiânia: 42 km. with connections by way of GO-462.

Location
Neighboring municipalities are:
north:  Brazabrantes
south:  Goiânia
east:  Nerópolis
west:  Goianira

Political Information
Mayor: Lourival Vaz da Costa (January 2005)
City council: 09
Eligible voters: 2,859 (December/2007)
Santo Antônio was a district of Goianira until it was dismembered in 1990.

Demographic Information
Population density: 29.31 inhabitants/km2 (2007)
Urban population: 3,508 (2007)
Rural population: 385 (2007)
Population growth:  3,28% from 2000 to 2007

Economic Information
The economy is based on subsistence agriculture, cattle raising, services, public administration, and small transformation industries.  
Cattle herd: 17,500 head (2006)
Main crops: bananas, sugarcane, rice (400 hectares), beans, manioc, oranges, lemons, tangerines, corn (800 hectares), tomatoes, and soybeans.

Education (2006)
Schools: 3
Classrooms: 26
Teachers: 52
Students: 1,258
Higher education: none
Adult literacy rate: 86.7% (2000) (national average was 86.4%)

Health (2007)
Hospitals: 01
Hospital beds: 0
Ambulatory clinics: 3
Infant mortality rate: 20.96 (2000) (national average was 33.0.

Municipal Human Development Index
MHDI: 0.749
State ranking:  79/242 municipalities
National ranking:  1,904/5,507 municipalities

Frigoletto.com

See also
List of municipalities in Goiás

References

Frigoletto
 Sepin

Municipalities in Goiás